Kadeisha Buchanan (born November 5, 1995) is a Canadian soccer player who plays as a centre-back for English Women's Super League club Chelsea and the Canada national team. Born in Toronto and raised in Brampton, Ontario, she is the youngest of seven girls in a single-parent home. Buchanan was only 17 when she made her debut for the national team on January 13, 2013.

Buchanan is a three-time Canadian Player of the Year, winning the award in the years of 2015, 2017, and 2020. At the 2015 Women's World Cup, she won the FIFA Young Player Award.

Early life
Born in Toronto and raised in Brampton, Ontario, Buchanan is the youngest of seven girls (ten siblings total) in a single-parent home. Buchanan's parents are originally from Jamaica, her father was born in Saint Thomas Parish and her mother in Montego Bay. Kadeisha grew up in the greater Toronto area, specifically Brampton and Mississauga. Buchanan attended Cardinal Leger Secondary School, where she played flag football, volleyball, basketball, and of course, soccer. She was enrolled in general studies and earned a place on the Garret Ford Academic Honor Roll.

Buchanan played college soccer at West Virginia University, for the Mountaineers, where she co-captained the team, qualified for the Big 12 Commissioner's Honor Roll, and won numerous more accolades.

Club career

Early career
In 2013, Buchanan played four games for the Toronto Lady Lynx, a USL W-League team. In 2014, she played a game for the Ottawa Fury Women, as well as in the W-League, right before they folded. In June 2016, Buchanan signed with Vaughan Azzurri of League1 Ontario to get game action prior to the 2016 Rio Olympics. She only played one game, however––a 9–0 win over Darby.

Lyon
Upon graduating from West Virginia University, Buchanan was a highly rated prospect prior to the 2017 NWSL College Draft. In December 2016, she was being linked with a move to Europe, along with fellow Canadian team member Ashley Lawrence. In January 2017, it was announced that Buchanan had signed with Olympique Lyonnais of Division 1 Féminine. In June 2018, Buchanan would sign a three-year contract extension which would keep her with Lyon until 2022.

Chelsea 
On June 10, 2022, Chelsea confirmed the signing of Buchanan on a three year deal.

International career
Buchanan was 14 years old when she was recruited to the Canadian youth program in 2010. She won a silver medal at the 2012 CONCACAF Women's U-17 championship in Guatemala. When she was called up to the Canadian women's national team on January 12, 2013, against China while still in high school, Buchanan became one of the youngest players on any women's national team.

Buchanan scored her first international goal against the United States on May 8, 2014, in Winnipeg, Manitoba, in front of the second largest crowd to ever watch a women's soccer game in Canada. The game ended in a 1–1 draw. Buchanan was also named Canada's Under-20 Women's Player of the Year in 2013, and anchored the host nation's defence at the 2014 Women's U-20 World Cup Canada in 2014.

In 2015, Buchanan established herself as one of the best defenders in the world, winning the Young Player Award in the 2015 FIFA Women's World Cup, as well as being named Canadian Women's Player of the Year, and being nominated for the 2015 FIFA Ballon d'Or.

On May 25, 2019, she was named to the roster for the 2019 FIFA Women's World Cup.

On February 9, 2020, Buchanan played her 100th match for Canada in a 0–3 loss against the United States.

Career statistics

Club

International
Scores and results list Canada's goal tally first, score column indicates score after each Buchanan goal.

Honours 
Olympique Lyonnais
 Division 1 Féminine: 2016–17, 2017–18, 2018–19, 2019–20, 2021-22
 Coupe de France: 2016–17, 2018–19, 2019–20
 UEFA Women's Champions League: 2016–17, 2017–18, 2018–19, 2019–20, 2021-22
Canada U17

CONCACAF Women's U-17 Championship: runner-up 2012 

Canada
Summer Olympics: 2020; bronze medal: 2016
 Algarve Cup: 2016
 Four Nations Tournament: 2015
Individual
MAC Hermann Trophy: 2016
Hardman Award: 2016
Honda Sports Award: 2016
 Best Female College Athlete ESPY Award nominee: 2017
 FIFA FIFPro World XI: 2015
IFFHS Women’s CONCACAF Team of the Year: 2021
Canadian Player of the Year: 2015, 2017, 2020
 FIFA Women's World Cup Best Young Player: 2015
 IFFHS CONCACAF Woman Team of the Decade 2011–2020

See also
 List of women's footballers with 100 or more international caps
 List of Olympic medalists in football
 List of Canadian sports personalities
 List of Nike sponsorships
 List of LGBT sportspeople

References

External links

1995 births
Living people
Soccer players from Toronto
Canadian sportspeople of Jamaican descent
Black Canadian women's soccer players
Canadian women's soccer players
Canada women's international soccer players
West Virginia Mountaineers women's soccer players
2015 FIFA Women's World Cup players
Women's association football defenders
Olympic soccer players of Canada
Olympic bronze medalists for Canada
Olympic medalists in football
Medalists at the 2016 Summer Olympics
Expatriate women's footballers in France
Olympique Lyonnais Féminin players
Division 1 Féminine players
Hermann Trophy women's winners
2019 FIFA Women's World Cup players
FIFA Century Club
Footballers at the 2020 Summer Olympics
Medalists at the 2020 Summer Olympics
Olympic gold medalists for Canada
League1 Ontario (women) players
Canadian LGBT sportspeople
Footballers at the 2016 Summer Olympics
Black Canadian LGBT people
Canadian expatriate sportspeople in England